In the Arms of My Enemy is a 2007 Belgian film written and directed by Micha Wald.

Plot
The story of the film happens in 1810, somewhere in an Eastern country. Nineteen-year-old Jakub and his eighteen-year-old brother Vladimir have just joined the Cossacks. Jakub is strong and protects Vladimir, who is weaker and quite fragile. Jakub quickly angers and often being locked for punishment. While he is away, Vladimir is being beaten, abused and raped by other boys. After Jakub and Vlad graduate from training, they understand that being a Cossack is quite harsh and terrible. They participate in Cossack raid on a village during which many women and children are killed. They despise murdering behavior and pillaging that Cossacks did and go AWOL.

Elias, 17 and Roman, 30 are two brothers who live in the woods and steal horses. They saw Jakub and Vladimir swimming in the pool, and seizing a moment, steal Jakub and Vladimir's horses. Vladimir and Jakub pursue the thieves and Roman kills Vladimir during confrontation. Jakub is devastated and cannot think about anything but revenge. Determined to avenge the death of his brother, he stalks Roman and Elias in order to get his revenge, finding that he may harm Roman by killing Elias. The events are drawn to a closing dramatic finale.

Cast

 Adrien Jolivet as Jakub
 Grégoire Colin as Roman
 François-René Dupont as Elias
 Grégoire Leprince-Ringuet as Vladimir
 Igor Skreblin as Fentik
 Mylène St-Sauveur as Virina
 Corentin Lobet as Grigori
 Benoît Randaxhe as Maska
 Morgan Marinne as Piotr
 Jacques Urbanska as Lieutenant Mikhail
 Thomas Coumans as Anton
 Thomas Salsmann as Aliosha
 Antonin Salsmann as Andrasz

Awards
Director Micha Wald was nominated for Critics Week Grand Prize and Golden Camera at Cannes Film Festival 2007 as well as for New Voices/New Visions Grand Jury Prize at Palm Springs International Film Festival 2008.

References

External links 
In the Arms of My Enemy on IMDb
In the Arms of My Enemy on Rotten Tomatoes

2007 films
Belgian adventure films
Films set in the 1810s
Films set in Europe
Belgian action films